It Is Easy to Die is a 1999 Russian action film directed by Aleksandr Khvan.

Plot 
The film tells about a man expecting the death of a loved one.

Cast 
 Polina Kutepova as Liza
 Aleksandr Lazarev as Ilya
 Georgiy Taratorkin as Feliks
 Svetlana Bragarnik as Yelena
 Aleksandr Tyunin as Igor
 Valentina Titova as Children's Home Director
 Elena Shevchenko as Natasha

References

External links 
 

1999 films
1990s Russian-language films
Russian action films
1999 action films